Stagecoach North East operates both local and regional bus services in County Durham, Northumberland, North Yorkshire and Tyne and Wear, England. It is a subsidiary of the Stagecoach Group, which operates bus, coach, rail and tram services across the United Kingdom. It is made up of five sub-division brands: Hartlepool, Newcastle upon Tyne, South Shields, Sunderland and Teesside.

Busways Travel Services
Stagecoach's first presence in the region came in July 1994, following the purchase of Busways Travel Services from its employees and managers – a deal valued at £27.5 million. Busways Travel Services Limited is now a holding company for Stagecoach's operations in Newcastle, South Shields and Sunderland – the three areas in which the former company operated.

Newcastle 
Stagecoach in Newcastle is the largest division of Stagecoach North East, operating local bus services within the city. A minority of services extend beyond the city boundary into neighbouring North Tyneside and Northumberland. The division operates from two depots: Slatyford and Walkergate. In spring 2003, a new depot was opened in Walkergate, at a cost of £6.5 million. It replaced the former Byker depot of Newcastle Corporation Tramways – the site of which has subsequently been redeveloped.

South Shields 
Stagecoach in South Shields operates local bus services within the borough of South Tyneside, with a network centring around the seaside town of South Shields. The division operates from a single depot, which dates back to the days of the South Shields Corporation Tramways.

Sunderland 
Stagecoach in Sunderland operate local bus services within the city of Sunderland, with a network centring around the port city. The division operates from a single depot in the city. In 2014, infrastructure capable of refuelling a fleet of 40 gas-powered Alexander Dennis Enviro 300 vehicles was installed at the depot.

Cleveland Transit
Busways became a key participant in the Darlington Bus War, after being purchased by the Stagecoach Group. In September 1994, the company registered a small network in Darlington, with operations subsequently commencing in November 1994.

In the same month, the Stagecoach Group purchased Cleveland Transit for £7.7 million. Cleveland Transit Limited is now a holding company for Stagecoach's operations in Hartlepool, Middlesbrough and Stockton-on-Tees.

In December 1994, Hartlepool Transport was purchased by the Stagecoach Group.

Darlington Transport Company refused to sell to the Stagecoach Group, with a subsequent inquiry by the Monopolies and Mergers Commission later concluding that the actions of Busways were a "contributing factor" in the company's collapse.

In August 2007, the company's operations in Darlington were transferred to Arriva North East. Following the takeover, services, as well as 28 vehicles and 78 drivers (with no changes to pay or conditions) were transferred, with vehicles subsequently repainted.

Hartlepool 
Stagecoach in Hartlepool is the smallest division of Stagecoach North East. The division operates local bus services in and around town of Hartlepool, with services running from a single depot.

Teesside 
Stagecoach on Teesside operate local bus services in the Tees Valley, with a network centring around the towns of Middlesbrough and Stockton-on-Tees. The division operates from a single depot, located in Stockton-on-Tees.

In January 2022, with subsidy from the Tees Valley Combined Authority, Stagecoach launched a service between Middlesbrough and Teesport, which aims to assist with employment opportunities in the area.

Tees Flex
Since February 2020, the boroughs of Darlington, Hartlepool, Middlesbrough, Redcar and Cleveland and Stockton-on-Tees have been served by the Tees Flex demand-responsive network – a three-year project valued at £3 million. Passengers can pre-book a bus by app, website or telephone, requesting pick-up and drop-off points within the serviced area, as well as destinations such as hospitals and train stations outside of the area. The network is served by a dedicated fleet of nine 16-seater Mercedes-Benz Sprinter minibuses, branded in a blue livery.

Fleet and operations

Depots
As of April 2022, the company operates from six bus depots across the region: Hartlepool, Newcastle upon Tyne (Slatyford and Walkergate), South Shields, Stockton-on-Tees and Sunderland.

Vehicles
As of April 2019, the fleet consists of 437 buses. The fleet consists mainly of diesel-powered single and double-deck buses manufactured by Alexander Dennis, with most recent deliveries being the Enviro200 MMC and Enviro400 MMC models.

In October 2011, a total of 26 diesel-hybrid Alexander Dennis Enviro400H were introduced in Newcastle on high-frequency services 39 and 40. Investment totalled £7.2 million, with £2.2 million from the Government's Green Bus Fund.

From February 2014, a fleet of 40 gas-powered Alexander Dennis Enviro300 were introduced on services 3, 13, 16 and 20 in Sunderland – a project costing £8 million.

Branding 

As of April 2022, vehicles in the fleet are in the process of being rebranded into the new fleet livery, which was revealed in January 2020. It consists of a white base with blue, green and orange swirls, featuring the company's updated logo. The former livery was introduced over 20 years prior, and consisted of vehicles painted in a white base, with a blue skirt, and red and orange swoops.

Notes

References

External links
 
 Busways Travel Services Ltd and Cleveland Transit Ltd on Companies House
Stagecoach North East website

Stagecoach Group bus operators in England
Bus operators in Tyne and Wear